Aindrias Stack (aka Aindrias de Staic) (born 9 November 1977, Galway, Ireland) is an Irish actor, musician and one of a new generation of Irish storytellers. He performs in both Irish and English. Aindrias Stack is best known for his award-winning one man shows Around the World on 80 Quid, The Year I Got Younger, The Summer I Did the Leaving and The Man From Moogaga.

Acting career
His first West End role was in Woody Sez, a show about the life and music of Woody Guthrie. His first lead role in a feature film was I Am Raftery – The Weaver of Words where he portrayed the blind 19th century itinerant Irish poet in the biographical movie.

Other film roles include Malarkey, The Year I Got Younger, Further We Search (directed by Darius Devas – 2009) and A Moment of Grace (directed by Dimitrios Pouliotis – 2010).

Irish television appearances include The Clinic on RTÉ and Craic de Staic on TG4. In 2013, he was one of three judges on TG4's Scór Encore, on which contestants perform traditional music, song or dance. He was the presenter of the competition dance show An Jig Gig on the same network in 2013, 2014 and 2015.

Awards

Filmography

Music career
Beginning as a traditional Irish fiddler, this travelling gypsy violinist has performed around the world in various violin and singing concerts as a solo act and with various bands. 
As part of an Irish outfit called The Blackwater Salmon, Aindrias won the Audience and Unique Musical Instrument Awards at the Miedzynarodowy Festival in Gdansk, Poland in 2007.
After a sell out run at the Edinburgh Fringe in 2007, Aindrias returned to Galway to launch Latchico, his first CD of his music.
Aindrias, along with Tim Scanlan and former Saw Doctors drummer, Éimhín Cradock, make up the Gaelic gypsy hip-hop band, The Latchikós. They have performed live in Canada, Ireland, England, France, the United States and Australia. They released their first single, "Off to Bondi Junction," and one 10-track CD, "Sugarbeat Sessions" in 2013.
Aindrias and The Latchikos are popular internationally for their hybrid of Spanish Gypsy Music and Hip Hop.

References

External links
Official Website for Aindrias de Staic
Woody Sez Cast List

Broadway World Review of The Craic with de Staic
The Scotsman Review of The Year I Got Younger
Adelaide Fringe Review of Around the World on 80 Quid
Melbourne Herald Sun Review of Around the World on 80 Quid

1977 births
Living people
Irish male film actors
Irish fiddlers
Irish male violinists
Male actors from Galway (city)
Musicians from County Galway
21st-century violinists
21st-century male musicians